Thabo Masualle (born 18 April 1982) is a Mosotho footballer who currently plays as a defender for Lioli Teyateyaneng. He has won 15 caps and scored two goals for the Lesotho national football team since 2006.

International career

International goals
Scores and results list Lesotho's goal tally first.

References

External links

Association football defenders
Lesotho footballers
Lesotho international footballers
1982 births
Living people